A.O. Katastari Football Club is a Greek football club, based in Katastari, Zakynthos, Greece.

Honours
Zakynthos FCA
Champions 2007–08, 2017–18
Cup winners 2008–09, 2015–16, 2016–17

References

Football clubs in the Ionian Islands (region)
Zakynthos
Association football clubs established in 1990
1990 establishments in Greece
Gamma Ethniki clubs